The Fermanagh Senior Hurling Championship was an annual Gaelic Athletic Association competition organised since 1904 by Fermanagh GAA among the top hurling clubs in County Fermanagh. The winner qualifies to represent the county in the Ulster Junior Club Hurling Championship or the Ulster Intermediate Club Hurling Championship, the winners of which progress to the respective All-Ireland Club Hurling Championships.

As of 2016, just one club, Lisbellaw St Patricks, represent County Fermanagh in hurling. This has been the case since the Lisnaskea club folded in 2015.

Roll of honour

References

External links
 Official Fermanagh Website
 Fermanagh on Hoganstand
 Fermanagh Club GAA

Fermanagh GAA club championships
Hurling competitions in Northern Ireland
Hurling competitions in Ulster
Senior hurling county championships
Hurling in County Fermanagh